Stojakovo is a village in the municipality of Bogdanci, North Macedonia. It is located close to the Greek border.

Demographics
According to the 2002 census, the village had a total of 1,931 inhabitants. Ethnic groups in the village include:

Macedonians 1,890
Serbs 36
Aromanians 1
Other 4

References

Villages in Bogdanci Municipality